Girl is the third studio album by Australian singer Dannii Minogue. It was released by Eternal Records on 8 September 1997 in the United Kingdom. Four singles were released to promote the album including the UK Dance Chart number ones "All I Wanna Do", "Everything I Wanted", "Disremembrance" and the Australian-only single, "Coconut". In November 2007, the album was reissued featuring slightly different artwork and a bonus disc of remixes by Rhino Entertainment. In 2022, to celebrate its twenty-fifth anniversary, Minogue announced an  LP release on coloured, recycled vinyl through Warner Music Australia.

Background
In 1995, Minogue had initially begun work on the follow-up album to Get into You. However, during recording sessions, Mushroom Records terminated their contract with Minogue. Following a divorce from Julian McMahon and a cover-shoot for Australian Playboy magazine, Minogue was approached by Warner Brothers Records to record a new album.

Recording
Sessions began in early 1997 with Ian Masterson and Brian Higgins.

Title and artwork
The album's name is a direct reference to the refrain "I may not be the innocent girl" in the album's lead single, "All I Wanna Do". The album artwork was shot by Steve Shaw and designed by Gerard Saint. In 2007, the re-issue featured slightly different artwork with Minogue's head tilted to face the camera and additional booklet design featuring lyrics and images from the album's respective music video shoots, also shot by Steve Shaw.

Composition
Girl was distinctively more dance-orientated than Minogue's previous work and stands as a dance, Drum and Bass, techno and electronica album. The album opens with the lead single "All I Wanna Do", which contained a more emphasised hi-NRG sound in contrast to the pop style. This would be felt on the rest of the album. The other tracks on Girl ranged from mature pop songs ("Heaven Can Wait", "Am I Dreaming?", "Everything I Wanted", "It's Amazing") to more techno-oriented tracks ("Disremembrance", "Movin' Up" and bonus tracks "Someone New", "Keep Up with the Good Times"). The album also included notable styles of dance music ("So in Love with Yourself", "If It Moves – Dub It", "Coconut") as well as ambient-infused sounds ("Everybody Changes Underwater").

Promotion
To promote the album, Minogue appeared on a variety of television shows for interviews and performances, in the United Kingdom and Australia, including Top of the Pops and TFI Friday. In 1998, Minogue also embarked on the Unleashed '98 tour consisting of 23 dates around the United Kingdom. Minogue was also part of the line-up for the Mushroom 25 Live concert held in Melbourne in 1998.

Singles
"All I Wanna Do" was released as the first single from the album on 18 August 1997. It peaked at number 4 on the UK Singles Chart and number 1 on the UK Dance Club Chart, in Australia, it peaked at number 11 on the ARIA Singles Chart and was certified gold.

"Everything I Wanted" was released as the second single on 1 November 1997. It peaked at number 15 on the UK Singles Chart and become her second single number 1 on the UK Dance Club Chart, while in Australia it peaked at number 44 on the ARIA Singles Chart.

"Disremembrance" was released on 16 March 1998 as the third single, was remixed by Flexifinger for release. It peaked at number 21 on the UK Singles Chart and become her third single number 1 on the UK Dance Club Chart. In Australia, it peaked at number 53 on the ARIA Singles Chart.

"Coconut" was released on 16 November 1998 as the fourth single in Australia only. It peaked at number 62 on the ARIA Singles Chart. The single featured the B-side "Someone New".

Other songs
Several remixes were commissioned of "Heaven Can Wait", some of which were on included on promotional releases of "Everything I Wanted" and released on the "Coconut" single. Previously unreleased mixes of "Movin' Up'" were released on the deluxe edition of the album in 2007 as well as a radio edit version of "Someone New".

Critical reception

Despite commercial disappointment, Girl received a generally positive reception from music critics. John Lucas from AllMusic complimented the album, writing: "The music is no longer so concerned with aping American trends; it was clearly influenced by the British dance club sounds of the mid-'90s. In short, Dannii was finally carving an identity for herself." The AllMusic site gave the album four out of five stars.

Commercial performance
Girl charted at number 57 in the United Kingdom on the UK Albums Chart and number 69 in Australia on the ARIA Albums Chart.

Track listing

Personnel

Dannii Minogue – lead vocals, backing vocals
Terry Ronald – backing vocals, vocal arrangement
Jackie Rawe – backing vocals
Kylie Minogue – backing vocals 
Paul Lewis – backing vocals
Diane Charlemagne – backing vocals
Suzanne Rhatigan – backing vocals
Owen Parker – guitar
Julian Dunkley – guitar
Drew Milligan – programming
Sally Herbert – strings
Margaret Roseberry – strings
Jules Singleton – violin
Anna Hemery – violin
Anne Wood – violin
Anne Stephenson – violin
Jackie Norrie – violin
Gini Ball – violin

Jocelyn Pook – viola
Claire Orsler – viola
Ellen Blair – viola
Dinah Beamish – cello
Nick Cooper – cello
Billy McGee – double bass
Gary Williams – fretless bass
Mark McGuire – engineer
Stuart McLennan – assistant producer, backing vocals
Tim Powell – assistant producer
Graham Stack – producer
Brian Higgins – producer
Matt Gray – producer
David Green – producer
Ian Masterson – producer
Mark Taylor – producer

Charts

Release history

References

1997 albums
2007 albums
Dannii Minogue albums
Warner Music Group albums